Velvet Turtle was a chain of fine-dining restaurants founded by Wally Botello based in Menlo Park, California, that at its height had 20 locations in California, plus a location in Washington state, and Arizona.

History
In 1986, Marriott Corp. sold the chain to a private investor group. The semi-formal restaurant chain closed down in the early 1990s when the popularity of casual dining was on the rise.

References

External links
 History
 Redevelopment of Former restaurant site

Defunct restaurants in California